Kasumbalesa may refer to:

 Kasumbalesa, Democratic Republic of the Congo: A town in Haut-Katanga Province, Democratic Republic of the Congo 
 Kasumbalesa, Zambia: A town in Chililabombwe District, Copperbelt Province, Zambia.